Yugoslav Radio Television (Jugoslavenska radiotelevizija/Југославенска радиотелевизија or Jugoslavenska radio-televizija/Југославенска радио-телевизија; JRT/ЈРТ) was the national public broadcasting system in the SFR Yugoslavia. It consisted of eight subnational radio and television broadcast centers with each one headquartered in one of the six constituent republics and two autonomous provinces of Yugoslavia.

History
JRT was one of the founding members of the European Broadcasting Union and the SFR Yugoslavia was the only socialist country among its founding members.

Among other activities, it organized the Yugoslavian national final for the Eurovision Song Contest and broadcast both events for the Yugoslav audience.

Each television center created its own programming independently, and some of them operated several channels. The system dissolved during the breakup of Yugoslavia in the early 1990s when most republics became independent countries. As a result, the once subnational broadcasting centers became public broadcasters of the newly independent states, with altered names:

Frequencies
JRT TV Frequencies:

 1956. Zagreb 1
 1958. Beograd 1
 1958. Ljubljana 1
 1964. Skopje 1
 1961. Sarajevo 1
 1970. Ljubljana 2
 1971. Koper – Capodistria
 1971. Titograd
 1971. Beograd 2
 1972. Zagreb 2
 1975. Novi Sad
 1975. Priština
 1977. Sarajevo 2
 1978. Skopje 2
 1979. Split (trials; became a RTV Center of RTVZ in 1980)
 1988. Zagreb 3, satellite program relays (usually Super Channel and Sky Channel); full program commenced in 1989 as Z3
 1989. Beograd 3K, same as Zagreb 3; full program from July 1989
 1989. 3P Novi Sad (time-sharing with Beograd 3)
 1989. Sarajevo 3, same as Beograd 3K and Zagreb 3 
 1991. Novi Sad Plus
 1991. Skopje 3, same as Beograd 3K and Zagreb 3
 1991. Titograd 3K, same as all third channels mentioned

See also
Udruženje javnih radija i televizija (Serbia and Montenegro)

References

External links
https://yugoslav-radio-television.com/

Defunct broadcasting companies
Broadcasting associations
Television in Yugoslavia
Organizations based in Yugoslavia
Multilingual broadcasters
Television channels and stations established in 1956
Television channels and stations disestablished in 1992
1956 establishments in Yugoslavia
1992 disestablishments in Yugoslavia